{{Infobox boxing match
| fight date    = December 17, 2011
| Fight Name    = Andre Ward vs. Carl Froch 
| image         = 
| location      =  Boardwalk Hall, Atlantic City, New Jersey
| titles        = WBA, WBC, and vacant The Ring super middleweight titles
| fighter1      =  Andre Ward
| nickname1     = S.O.G.
| record1       = 24–0 (13 KO)
| hometown1     = Oakland,California,United States
| height1       = 6 feet
| Referee       = Jack Reiss 
| weight1       = 168 lb
| style1        = Orthodox
| recognition1  = WBA super middleweight champion[[The Ring (magazine)|The Ring]] No. 9 ranked pound-for-pound fighter
| fighter2      =  Carl Froch
| nickname2     = The Cobra
| record2       = 28–1 (20 KO)
| hometown2     = Nottingham,England,United Kingdom
| height2       = 6 feet 1 inches
| weight2       = 168 lb 
| style2        = Orthodox
| recognition2  = WBC super middleweight champion
| result        = Ward defeats Froch via unanimous decision.
}}

Andre Ward vs. Carl Froch was the Super Six World Boxing Classic Final championship fight for the WBC, WBA, & vacant The Ring''  super middleweight titles. The bout was held on December 17, 2011, at the Boardwalk Hall in Atlantic City, New Jersey, United States. and was  televised on Showtime.

Pre-Fight
From the time it was announced in July 2009 until the final bout just before Halloween 2011, the super middleweight tournament went on for about 800 days.

Froch was due to face Ward in Atlantic City on October 29 in the final of the Super Six, but Ward's injury required the rescheduling of the bout to December 17, 2011. The fight was promoted by Matchroom Sport (promoted Froch) and Goossen Tutor Promotions (promoted Ward)

Ward 
Ward advanced to the final by winning his tournament bouts. He won his title against Kessler in his opening bout, scoring a dominant 11th-round technical decision. Ward beat Allan Green in his second bout. Ward's Group Stage 3 bout called off when Dirrell, his 2004 U.S. Olympic teammate, dropped out of the tournament. Ward instead faced contender Sakio Bika outside of the tournament and won a decision. In his May semifinal fight, Ward defeated Abraham to advance to the final.

Froch 
Froch defeated Dirrell on a split decision in England in his opening-round bout. Then Froch lost a decision (and his title) to Denmark's Kessler in Denmark in Group Stage 2.
However, after Kessler dropped out, Froch met Abraham for the vacant belt in Group Stage 3 and won a decision to claim his title. Froch advanced to the final in June by scoring a majority decision against Johnson.

Result 
Although the fight was competitive throughout, Ward was able to use his superior speed and movement to help him outbox Froch for the first half of the encounter, neutralizing his attack and beating him to the punch at both distance and close range. Ward seemed to ease off in the later rounds and Froch began to edge them, looking the stronger by the end of the bout. However, all three judges felt Ward had done enough to become the new unified super middleweight champion.

Main card
Super Middleweight Championship  Andre Ward (c) vs.  Carl Froch (c)

Ward def. Froch by unanimous decision (115-113, 115-113, 118-110) to retain the WBA (super) Super Middleweight title, and won the WBC, Ring Magazine world Super Middleweight Titles. Ward also became the Super Six world boxing classic tournament winner.

Preliminary card
Heavyweight bout  John Lennox vs.  Jeramiah Witherspoon

Lennox def. Witherspoon by TKO :50 of round 3

Light Heavyweight bout  Cornelius White vs.  Yordanis Despaigne

White def. Despaigne by unanimous decision (60-53, 59-55, 59-55)

Welterweight bout  Kell Brook vs.  Luis Galarza

Brook def. Galarza by TKO 1:38 of round 5

Light Heavyweight bout  Edison Miranda vs.  Kariz Kariuki

Miranda def. Kariuki by TKO in 2:04 of round 5

Heavyweight bout  Bowie Tupou vs.  Donnell Holmes

Tupou def. Holmes by unanimous decision (95-94, 96-93, 95-94)

Middleweight bout  Boyd Melson vs.  Danny Lugo

Melson def. Lugo by TKO 2:01 of round 3

International broadcasting

References

External links
Froch vs. Ward Official Fight Card from BoxRec

2011 in boxing
2011 in sports in New Jersey
December 2011 sports events in the United States
Boxing matches at Boardwalk Hall